The Australian Committee on Computation and Automatic Control (ANCCAC) was formed in 1958, with Professor John Bennett as the Foundation Chairman. It ran a computing conferences in Australia from 1960 and in 1961 was accepted as a member of the International Federation for Information Processing (IFIP). The Australian Computer Society took over these roles in 1969 and ANCCAC was dissolved.

ANCCAC Prize 
The ANCCAC Prize was established by ACS in 1969, to commemorate Australia's computer pioneers. A medal and a cash prize is awarded each year for the paper published each year in the ACS Journal.

ANCCAC Prize recipients 
1991 Swatman P.A., Swatman P.M.C. and Everett J.E. (1990) "Stages of Growth of an Innovative Software House: an Additional Criterion for Software Package Selection", Australian Computer Journal, Vol. 22, No. 7, August, 88-98.

2002 Sale, A. (2001) "Broadband Internet Access in Regional Australia", Journal of Research and Practice in Information Technology 33(4): 346-355.

2003 C. A. Middleton (2002) "Who needs a `Killer App`? Two Perspectives on Content in Residential Broadband Networks". Journal of Research and Practice in Information Technology 34(2): 67-81.

External links
ACS web site
ACS ANCCAC Award

Professional associations based in Australia
Information technology organizations based in Oceania
Organizations established in 1958
1958 establishments in Australia
Organizations disestablished in 1969